Fireworks is a 1997 Italian comedy film directed by Leonardo Pieraccioni.

Cast

Reception
It set an opening record in Italy with a gross of $13.5 million for the week from a record 610 screens. It went on to be the highest-grossing film in Italy for the year and grossed $31.9 million worldwide.

References

External links

1997 films
Films directed by Leonardo Pieraccioni
1990s Italian-language films
1997 comedy films
Italian comedy films
Italian romantic comedy films
1990s Italian films